Tremanotidae is an extinct family of Paleozoic fossil molluscs with isostrophically coiled shells. They occupy an uncertain position taxonomically: it is not known whether they were (gastropods (snails) or monoplacophorans.

Taxonomy 
The taxonomy of the Gastropoda by Bouchet & Rocroi, 2005 categorizes Tremanotidae in the superfamilia Bellerophontoidea within the 
Paleozoic molluscs of uncertain systematic position with isostrophically coiled shells (Gastropoda or Monoplacophora). This family has no subfamilies.

Genera 

Genera in the family Tremanotidae include:
 Tremanotus Hall, 1867 - type genus of the family Tremanotidae. Synonyms: Gyrotrema, Tremagyrus.
 Tremanotus angustata - synonym: Tremanotus alpheus.
 Tremanotus aymestriensis
 Tremanotus chicagoensis
 Tremanotus civis
 Tremanotus compressus
 Tremanotus crassolare
 Tremanotus cyclocostatus
 Tremanotus deficiens
 Tremanotus dilatatus - synonym: Tremanotus girvanensis.
 Tremanotus inopinata
 Tremanotus minutus
 Tremanotus nautiloidea
 Tremanotus nobile
 Tremanotus parvus
 Tremanotus pervoluta
 Tremanotus planorbis
 Tremanotus plicosum
 Tremanotus polygyratus
 Tremanotus portlocki
 Tremanotus pritchardi
 Tremanotus serpentinus
 Tremanotus trigonostoma
 Tremanotus tuboides
 Boiotremus Horný, 1962
 Boiotremus beraunensis
 Boiotremus caelatus
 Boiotremus distans
 Boiotremus fortis
 Boiotremus kosovensis
 Boiotremus longitudinalis (Lindström, 1884) - synonyms: Tremanotus longitudinalis, Tremanotus incipiens
 Goniotremus Horný, 1992
 Goniotremus insectus - synonym: Goniotremus polygonus.
 Goniotremus involutus

References

External links 

Prehistoric gastropods
Taxa named by Adolf Naef